This is a list of the players who were on the rosters of the teams who participated in the 2004 Summer Olympics for women's basketball.

Group A

The following is the Australia roster in the women's basketball tournament of the 2004 Summer Olympics.

The following is the Brazil roster in the women's basketball tournament of the 2004 Summer Olympics.

The following is the Greece roster in the women's basketball tournament of the 2004 Summer Olympics.

The following is the Japan roster in the women's basketball tournament of the 2004 Summer Olympics.

The following is the Nigeria roster in the women's basketball tournament of the 2004 Summer Olympics.

The following is the Russia roster in the women's basketball tournament of the 2004 Summer Olympics.

Group B

The following is the China roster in the women's basketball tournament of the 2004 Summer Olympics.

The following is the Czech Republic roster in the women's basketball tournament of the 2004 Summer Olympics.

The following is the New Zealand roster in the women's basketball tournament of the 2004 Summer Olympics.

The following is the South Korea roster in the women's basketball tournament of the 2004 Summer Olympics.

The following is the Spain roster in the women's basketball tournament of the 2004 Summer Olympics.

The following is the United States roster in the women's basketball tournament of the 2004 Summer Olympics.

References

External links
Official Olympic Report

squads
2004